The Freedom Party of New York is a party founded in 2010 by a former Black Panther Party member and New York City Councilmember Charles Barron on a black progressive platform.

That party finished sixth out of seven candidates in the 2010 gubernatorial election with Barron receiving 20,775 votes according to preliminary reports. The final vote was 24,572.

The party held a founding convention February 13–14, 2011 in New York City, adopting a platform of "structural transformation of the political and economic system that included: An equitable redistribution of wealth, progressive taxation, free education from pre-k to post baccalaureate, jobs, reparations, housing, political prisoners, women’s rights, support for youth and seniors, end to police brutality and deadly force, and clean and renewable energy."

Michael K. Greys was the party's nominee in the 2013 New York City mayoral election. He finished in 11th place out of 15 candidates on the ballot with 690 votes. The party did not field a candidate in the 2014 gubernatorial election.

External links
Website

References

Defunct progressive parties in the United States
Black political parties in the United States
Regional and state political parties in New York (state)